Mitch Maddox is a computer systems manager and former Internet personality. In a promotion for several Internet companies, he changed his name to DotComGuy and lived the entire year of 2000 in his house in Dallas, Texas, buying all food and other necessities online. Video from the house was streamed on the dotcomguy.com web site. Sponsors of the project included United Parcel Service, 3Com, Network Solutions, Piper Jaffray, Travelocity and an online grocer (now called Edwardo's). The site has since been acquired and today offers an on-site technical assistance service.

Maddox is now a technology evangelist for Ultimate Software. At the end of each year he holds a day-long DotComGuy reunion on Internet relay chat.

References

External links

DotComGuy Fan Page
DotComGuy Franchise the follow on business from one of the investors.

Living people
Year of birth missing (living people)
Dot-com bubble